Kirkgate is a street in the city centre of Leeds, in England.

History
The street originated in the Mediaeval period, leading from the centre of the settlement to the parish church.  The Anglo-Saxon Leeds Cross was found when the church was replaced by the current Leeds Minster, in the 19th century.  By the time of the Domesday Book, Leeds also had a manor house, which lay on the street.  The street became associated with cloth manufacturing, and in 1711, the First White Cloth Hall was constructed on the street.  Other early buildings included a chantry, built in 1430, later replaced by a vicarage, the town's bakehouse, and a prison, built in 1655.

The city's first hospital was established in a house on the street in 1767.  In 1790, the Ancient Order of Foresters was founded at the Crown Inn on the street, although the building was demolished in 1935.  In the 19th century, the Kirkgate Market was constructed at the city centre end of the street, while a railway line was built, spanning the middle of the street.  In 1984, a police officer, John Speed, was shot and killed on the street, and there is a memorial in his memory.

The Welcome to Leeds website notes that the street became run-down, but by the 2020s became "a more calm street which has recently been reinvigorated by exciting local businesses".

Layout and architecture

The street runs south-east from the junction of Briggate and Commercial Street, to a junction with East Street and Duke Street.  Fish Street, Vicar Lane, New York Street, Harper Street, Cross York Street, and Church Lane lead off its north-east side, while Central Road, New Market Street, Call Lane, Wharf Street, High Court, and Maude Street lead off its south-west side.

Notable buildings on the north-east side of Kirkgate include the grade I listed Kirkgate Market.  On the south-west side of the street lie the former bank at 110 Kirkgate, designed by William Bakewell; the grade II* listed First White Cloth Hall; and the grade I listed Leeds Minster.

References

Further reading

Streets in Leeds